Sarah Harris Fayerweather (April 16 1812 – November 16 1878) was an African-American activist, abolitionist, and school integrationist. Beginning in January 1833 at the age of twenty, she attended Prudence Crandall's Canterbury Female Boarding School in Canterbury, Connecticut, the first integrated school in the United States.

Early life and education
Fayerweather was born Sarah Ann Major Harris on April 16, 1812, in Norwich, Connecticut. The daughter of William Monteflora Harris and Sally Prentice Harris, both of whom were free farmers, Fayerweather was of African descent and the second oldest of twelve children. She was raised in the Orthodox Congregational Church of Canterbury.

In September 1832, Fayerweather requested admission to the Canterbury Female Boarding School. In a letter to William Lloyd Garrison's newspaper The Liberator, Crandall recalls Sarah's visit: "A colored girl of respectability – a professor of religion – and daughter of honorable parents, called on me sometime during the month of September last, and said in a very earnest manner, 'Miss Crandall, I want to get a little more learning, enough if possible to teach colored children, and if you will admit me into your school I shall forever be under the greatest obligation to you. If you think it will be the means of injuring you, I will not insist on the favor.'" After brief deliberation, Crandall admitted her to the school and refused to expel her when the parents of most of the other attendees withdrew their daughters.

Faced with severe opposition from the Canterbury community, Crandall closed the existing school – only to reopen in 1833 in order to teach a group of solely African-American students. Sarah continued to attend the school in the face of harassment and ostracization until Crandall, afraid for her pupils' safety after a mob converged on the school in September 1834, closed the school permanently.

Family life
Fayerweather married George Fayerweather, Jr., a mixed-race blacksmith ten years her senior, on November 28, 1833. The couple moved to New London, Connecticut in 1841 before moving to Kingston, Rhode Island, in 1855 to raise their eight children. Both Fayerweather and her husband supported abolitionism and racial equality; Fayerweather joined the Kingston Anti-Slavery Society, attended antislavery meetings held by the American Anti-Slavery Society in various cities across the North, maintained a correspondence with her former teacher Prudence Crandall and former slave and abolitionist Frederick Douglass, and subscribed to The Liberator until Garrison ceased publishing it in 1865. She also maintained an active church life, joining the Sunday school class at Kingston's Congregational church.

Death
Surviving her husband by nine years, Fayerweather died on November 16, 1878, from a swelling of the neck. She was buried in the Old Fernwood Cemetery in Kingston, Rhode Island.

Legacy and honors
In 1970 Fayerweather Hall, a dormitory on the campus of University of Rhode Island, was named for Sarah Harris Fayerweather. The Fayerweather Craft Guild, located in Kingston at the site of the Fayerweather family's former home and blacksmith shop, was also named in her honor.

References

Further reading

External links
 Guide to the Fayerweather Family Papers, University of Rhode Island
 Digital Collection of The Liberator, William Lloyd Garrison's abolitionist paper

People from South Kingstown, Rhode Island
People from Canterbury, Connecticut
People from Norwich, Connecticut
School desegregation pioneers
1812 births
1878 deaths
History of Rhode Island
History of Connecticut
African-American abolitionists